Basora is a surname. Notable people with this surname include:

 Adrian A. Basora (born 1938), American diplomat
 Estanislau Basora (1926–2012), Spanish football player
Basora is also the Spanish form of Basra.